Ekaterina Dmitrievna "Katya" Ryabova (born 4 August 1997) is a Russian singer. She is from Shchyolkovo, but now resides in Yubileyny.

Career
She was selected to represent her country in the Junior Eurovision Song Contest 2009 with the song Malenkiy Prints (The Little Prince). At the contest on 21 November in Kyiv, she tied for second place with Luara Hayrapetyan from Armenia. In 2011 she became the first returning artist in Junior Eurovision history, representing her country with the song Kak Romeo i Dzhulyetta (Like Romeo and Juliet), finishing in fourth place.

References

External links
Russia at Junior Eurovision 2009
Russia at Junior Eurovision 2011

Junior Eurovision Song Contest entrants for Russia
1997 births
Living people
Russian singer-songwriters
Russian rock singers
21st-century Russian singers
Pop rock singers
Russian child singers
Russian pop singers
Russian women singer-songwriters
21st-century Russian women singers